Cavite State University - CCAT Campus is one of the 11 satellite campuses of Cavite State University (CvSU), with its main campus located in Indang, Cavite. It is also known as CvSU-R and Cavite State University College of Arts and Trade. It is located at Brgy. Tejeros Convention, Rosario, Cavite and occupies  of land. It is formerly known as Cavite College of Arts and Trades (CCAT).

History

As CCAT 
The Cavite College of Arts and Trades (CCAT) was established by Republic Act No. 5966 authored by Cong. Justiniano S. Montano was approved on June 21, 1969, as a National College of Arts and Trades primarily to provide higher technological, professional, occupational, and vocational education. The college was inaugurated on August 8, 1970, and regular classes for the Two-Year Trade Technical Curriculum started on August 12, 1970, with 27 students. Benjamin C. Lorenz Ana acted as the Officer-in-Charge for four years.

It served as Training Center for National Manpower Training Program in February, 1971 to July, 1972. A special One-Year Course was also offered in the same year. As per Department Order No. 20 s. 1973, the Secondary Trade Curriculum was also offered in the same year the Two-Year Trade Technician Education was implemented.

Leoncio Y. Manarang became the First Superintendent until 1976.

After five years of existence, the school was classified as Teacher Education Institution in Industrial Education. Courses offered were Bachelor of Science in Industrial Education and Bachelor of Science in Industrial Technology. The two-year Trade Technical Education was also offered. Arturo P. Casuga served CCAT as Superintendent. It also opened evening classes on Short-term Vocational Courses.

In 1976, the ROTC unit was established in CCAT to enroll the college students for military training and tactics, a requisite for graduation as well as requirement for all Filipinos to undergo military training.

In 1982, CCAT became a beneficiary of the Technical and Vocational Education Project (TVEP) which was aided by the Asian Development Bank (ADB). Seven years later, the college was selected as a recipient of the Philippine-Australian Technical and Vocational Education Project (PATVEP). In 1983, CCAT was selected as TVEP Research and Information Center for Region IV.

In 1984, CCAT started the Two-Year Diploma in Industrial Technology which was later replaced by the Three Year Diploma of Technology

In 1991, Revelino F. Apilado took over as Officer-in-Charge until 1993.

In 1993, Petronio N. Carrera became the third CCAT Superintendent until 2000.

By virtue of Resolution No. R214-917, s.1997 of the Commission on Higher Education (CHED), CCAT was authorized to offer the Bachelor of Science in Hotel and Restaurant Management (BSHRM) effective SY 1997–1998. It also offered Associate of Technology.

In 1999, CCAT offered the Bachelor of Science in Hotel and Restaurant Management.

As CvSU-R 

In 2001, CCAT was integrated with the Cavite State University (CvSU) by virtue of CHED Memo No. 27, s. 2000. Dr. Maria C. Yaba was designated Assistant to the CvSU President for CvSU Rosario Campus operation.
Additional courses were offered:
BS in Business Management (BSBM)
Associate in Computer Technology (ACT)

In 2002, CvSU Rosario offered additional degree courses: Mrs. Sally G. Sandoval was designated Officer-in-Charge until June 2003.
BS in Electrical Engineering (BSEE)
BS in Mechanical Engineering (BSME)

In 2003, The first Campus Dean, Dr. Reynaldo E. Samonte was designated to manage the operation of CvSU Rosario Campus from June 18,2003 until July 2007.

In 2007, Dr. Isaias A. Banaag was designated as the new Campus Dean from August 2007 until August 2008
CvSU offered the Bachelor of Science in Computer Engineering.

In 2008, CvSU Rosario Campus offered the Bachelor of Science in Computer Science and Bachelor of Science in Information Technology.

Dr. Lorna L. Penales took over as Officer-in-Charge of CvSU Rosario Campus until January 2009.

Dr. Cecilia F. Genuino became third Campus Dean until February 17, 2013.

Dr. Camilo A. Polinga was designated as Officer-in-Charge starting February 18, 2013.

References

Universities and colleges in Cavite